Criminal gangs are found throughout Mainland China but are most active in Chongqing, Shanghai, Macau, Tianjin, Shenyang, and Guangzhou as well as in Hong Kong, Malaysia, Singapore and Taiwan. The number of people involved in organized crime on the mainland has risen from around 100,000 in 1986 to around 1.5 million in the year 2000.

Since the new century, there are two academic books focusing on Chinese organized crime. Based on rich empirical work, these books offer how Chinese criminal organizations survive in the changing socio-economic and political environment.  Y. K. Chu's Triads as Business looks at the role of Hong Kong Triads in legal, illegal and international markets. Peng Wang's The Chinese Mafia examines the rise of mainland Chinese organized crime and the political-criminal nexus (collusion between gangs and corrupt police officers) in reform and opening era of China.

Triad societies

The following is a list of Chinese triad societies:

 14K Group 十四K
14K Baai Lo 十四K 湃廬
14K Chung 十四K 忠字堆
14K Chung Yee Tong 十四K 忠義堂
14K Hau 十四K 孝字堆
14K Kim 十四K 劍字堆
14K Lai 十四K 禮字堆
14K Lun 十四K 倫字堆
14K Ngai 十四K 毅字堆
14K Sai Shing Tong 十四K 西勝堂
14K Sai Yee Tong 十四K 西義堂
14K Sat 十四K 實字堆
14K Shun 十四K 信字堆
14K Tai Huen Chai 十四K 大圈仔
14K Tak 十四K 德字堆
14K Yan 十四K 仁字堆
14K Yee 十四K 義字堆
14K Yee Shing Tong 十四K 義勝堂
14K Yung 十四K 勇字堆
 Long Zi Group 龙子字頭
 Long Zi Tong 龙子堂
 Long Zi Kongsi 龙子會館
 Long Zi Association 龙子协会
 LZK
 Luen Group 聯字頭
 Luen Kung Lok 聯公樂
 Luen Lok Tong 聯樂堂(單耳)
 Luen Shun Tong 聯順堂
 Luen Ying She 聯英社(老聯)
 Luen Fei Ying 聯飛英
 Luen Hung Ying 聯鴻英
 Luen To Ying 聯桃英
 Wo Group 和字頭
 Wo Shing Wo 和勝和
 Wo Shing Yee 和勝義
 Wo On Lok (Shui Fong) 和安樂(水房)
 Wo Hop To 和合圖(老和)
 Wo Lee Kwan 和利群
 Wo Kao Chi 和九指
 Wo Kwan Lok 和群樂
 Wo Lee Wo 和利和
 Wo Shing Tong 和勝堂
 Wo Yau Wo 和友和
 Wo Yee Tong 和義堂
 Wo Yung Yee 和勇義
 Wo Hung Shing 和洪勝
 Wo Kwan Ying 和群英
 Wo Luen Shing 和聯勝
 Wo Yat Ping 和一平
 Wo Yee Ping 和二平
 Ah Kong Company 阿公党
 Ang Bin Hoay 昂斌會
 Ang Soon Tong 洪顺堂
 Big Circle Gang 大圈幫
 Black Dragons 黑龍
 Cai Group
Chongqing group 重慶組
 Chuen Group 全字頭
 Chuen Chi Wo 全志和
 Chuen Yat Chi 全一志(老全)
 Ghee Hin Kongsi 義興公司
 Green Gang 青帮
CP=√169 Gang
 Hai San 海山
 Ping On 平安
 Rung Group 梯級組
 Shing Group 盛集團
 Sin Ma 仙馬
 Sio Sam Ong 小三王
 Tung Group 東字頭
 Tung Kung She 東公社
 Tung Kwan She 東群社
 Tung Luen She 東聯社(老東)
 Tung On Tong 東安堂
 Tung Ying She 東英社
 Tung On Wo 東安和
 Tung Kwan Ying 東群英
 Tong Group 同字頭
 Tong Kwan Ying 同群英
 Tong Lok 同樂
 Tong San Wo 同新和(老同)
 Jackson Street Boys 積臣街小子
 Kung Lok 功乐
 Kwong Group 廣字頭
 Kwong Hung 廣雄
 Kwong Luen Shing 廣聯盛(老廣)
 Kwong Shing 廣盛
 Kwong Sing Tong 廣聲堂
 Yuet Group 粵字頭
 Yuet Kwong 粵廣
 Yuet Tung 粵東
 Ching Group 正字頭
 Ching Lung Tuen 正龍團
 Chiu Chow Group 潮州幫
 Fuk Yee Hing 福義興(老福)
 Sun Yee On 新義安(老新)
 Chiu Kwong She 潮光社
 Chiu Luen Yee 潮聯義
 Chung Chau Yuet 中秋月
 Chung Sun Tong 忠信堂
 Hoi Luk Fung 海陸豐互助社
 King Yee 敬義
 Sam Shing She 三聖社
 Tai Ho Choi 大好彩
 Yat Lo Fat 一路发幫
 Yee Kwan 義群
 Yee Shing Tong 義勝堂
 Wah Ching 華青
 Wah Kee 華記
 Taiwan Gangs 台灣幫派
 Four Seas Gang 四海幫
 Bamboo Union 竹聯幫
 Tien Tao Meng (Heavenly Way Alliance) 天道盟
 Sung Lien Gang (Pine Union) 松聯幫
 Niu Pu Gang 牛埔幫
 Chi Hsien Gang (Seven Yin Gang) 七賢幫
 Ta hu Gang (Big Lake Gang) 大湖幫 
 Hsi Pei Gang (Northwest Gang) 西北幫
 Pei Lien Gang (North Union) 北聯幫
 Sun Kuang Gang (Three Lights) 三光幫
 San Huan Gang (Three Circle) 三環幫
 Fei Ying Gang (Fly Eagle) 飛鷹幫
 Monga Group 艋舺角頭

Criminally influenced tongs

 Ivan Tong
 Bing Kong Tong
 Chang Sing
 Four Brothers
 Ghee Kong Tong 致公堂
 Hop Sing Tong
 Hip Sing Tong
 Hung Mun Tong
 Kim Ghee Tong 
 Long Zii Tong
 Pa Hai Tong
 Tong Meng Gok
 Tong Tran
 Tsung Tsin Association
 Tung Oon Association
 Wing Kong
 W Zhang Tong

Gangs

 21 Boys 廿一仔
 Asian Militants 亞洲進擊
 Black Bugs 黑蟲
 Black Eagles 黑鷹
 Chung Ching Yee (Joe Boys) 忠精義
 Chung Yee 忠義
 Continentals 大陸幣
 Dai Ben (Cookies) 大餅
 Eagle Dragons 龍鷹
 Flying Circle Boys 飛圈仔
 Flying Dragons 飛龍幫
 Fong-Fong Boys 豐芳男
 Fuk Ching 福青 
 Ghost Shadows 鬼影幫
 Golden Star 金星
 Green Dragons 青龍
NICKAR CHING 香港仔
 Hop Sing Boys 合勝仔
 Hung Pho 紅火
 Immortals 神仙
 Kit Jai 傑仔
 Korrupted Boys 男孩
 Liang Shan (Quen Ying) 梁山
 Mo Ming Pai 無名派 
 Phoenician Warriors
 Ping Boys 平仔
 Raiders 攻略
 Red Dragon
 Red Sun 紅陽
 Salakau 369
 Seven Stars 七星
 Sing Wa 興華
 Snakehead (gang) 蛇頭
Suey Sing Boys 萃勝仔
 Taiwan Boys 台灣仔
 Thien Long Boyz  天龍
 Tung On 東安幫
 Viet Ching 越青
 White Dragons 白龍
 White Eagles 白鷹
 White Tigers 白虎
 Yau Lai 友利

See also
 Criminal tattoos
 List of criminal enterprises, gangs and syndicates
 Secret societies in Singapore
 Tiandihui

Notes

Further reading
 Chu, Y. K. (2002). The triads as business. Routledge.
 Ko-lin Chin.Chinatown Gangs: Extortion, Enterprise, and Ethnicity. Oxford University Press, 2000.
 Peter Huston. Tongs, Gangs, and Triads: Chinese Crime Groups in North America (1995)
 Lo, T. W. (2010). Beyond Social Capital: Triad Organized Crime in Hong Kong and China. British Journal of Criminology, 50(5), 851-872.
 Wang, Peng. "The Increasing Threat of Chinese Organised Crime: national, regional and international perspectives", The RUSI Journal Vol. 158, No.4, (2013),pp. 6–18.
 Wang, Peng (2017). The Chinese Mafia: Organized Crime, Corruption, and Extra-Legal Protection. Oxford: Oxford University Press.

External links
 Q&A for tourists on triads in Hong Kong
 SF Weekly Feature Article Profiling Member of Hop Sing Tong -- Raymond "Shrimp Boy" Chow (2007)
 An essay about Triads
 Asian Gang Sweep 2 Chinatown biz bigs busted. Pete Bowles. Newsday. 12/10/1993.
 Asian Organized Crime Groups - Chinese - Tongs and Street Gangs
 SF Weekly Feature Article Profiling Member of Hop Sing Tong -- Raymond "Shrimp Boy" Chow (2007)
 Tongs, Encyclopedia of Chicago
 Phoenix TV Special Coverage

 
 
 
Chinese criminal
Criminal organizations
 
 
 
 
 
 
Chinese

Organizations